Elections were held in the state of Western Australia on 14 February 1953 to elect all 50 members to the Legislative Assembly. The two-term Liberal-Country Party coalition government, led by Premier Sir Ross McLarty, was defeated by the Labor Party, led by Opposition Leader Albert Hawke.

The election was notable in that 22 of the 50 seats were not contested at the election. Only two other elections—those held in 1890 and 1894—had a greater percentage or number of uncontested seats.

Key dates

Results

|}

 319,941 electors were enrolled to vote at the election, but 22 seats (44% of the total) were uncontested—12 Labor seats (six more than 1950) representing 65,993 enrolled voters, 3 Liberal seats (one more than 1950) representing 14,297 enrolled voters, and 7 Country seats (three more than 1950) representing 34,007 enrolled voters.

See also
 Members of the Western Australian Legislative Assembly, 1950–1953
 Members of the Western Australian Legislative Assembly, 1953–1956
 Candidates of the 1953 Western Australian state election

References

Elections in Western Australia
1953 elections in Australia
1950s in Western Australia
February 1953 events in Australia